The Federal Correctional Institution, McKean (FCI McKean) is a medium-security United States federal prison for male inmates in Pennsylvania. It is operated by the Federal Bureau of Prisons, a division of the United States Department of Justice. An adjacent satellite prison camp houses minimum-security male offenders.

FCI McKean is located in northwest Pennsylvania between the towns of Bradford and Kane, 90 miles south of Buffalo, New York.

Notable incidents

2013 escape
On August 21, 2013, Locksley Milwood, who was serving a sentence for participating in a drug ring that smuggled ecstasy, methamphetamine, and marijuana into the U.S. from Canada, escaped from the satellite prison camp adjacent to FCI McKean. The prison camp houses minimum-security inmates in dormitory housing, has a relatively low staff-to-inmate ratio and limited or no perimeter fencing. Officers from the Pennsylvania State Police and surrounding municipal departments were alerted and participated in the search. Several hours later, an officer from the Bradford Township Police Department stopped a vehicle and found Milwood inside. Milwood pleaded guilty to escape in December 2013 and was sentenced to two additional months in prison. He is currently incarcerated at the Federal Medical Center, Lexington in Kentucky and was scheduled for release in April 2017.

Notable inmates

See also

List of U.S. federal prisons
Federal Bureau of Prisons
Incarceration in the United States

References

Buildings and structures in McKean County, Pennsylvania
Mckean
Prisons in Pennsylvania
1989 establishments in Pennsylvania